Mary Margaret O'Hara is a Canadian singer-songwriter, actress and composer. She is best known for the album Miss America, released in 1988. She released two albums and an EP under her own name, and remains active as a live performer, as a contributor to compilation albums and as a guest collaborator on other artists' albums.

Music career

Early stages
O'Hara was born in the late 1950s in Toronto, Ontario, Canada, to a family of Irish Catholic descent. She is the sister of comedic actress Catherine O'Hara. Her early musical tastes included Van Morrison, Dinah Washington, and her father's jazz records. She was a student at the Ontario College of Art and Design in the 1970s and was involved in the music scene as a member of Toronto bands Dollars, Songship and Go Deo Chorus.

In 1983, O'Hara left Go Deo and was signed by Virgin Records. Her contract with Virgin continued and eventually led to the 1988 release of Miss America. O'Hara later reflected on the production experience, noting "I loved the Celtic crosses and the sheep rolling around the hills by the studio in Wales. But for Virgin to go from, 'You can do whatever you want', to 'What have you done?'—that was tough."

In addition, she did some work as a graphic artist, including lettering for the cover of Dalbello's album whomanfoursays.

Debut album

In 1987, Michael Brook saw O'Hara in performance and soon took on the job of producing O'Hara's attempts at an album. He ultimately added new vocals to and remixed material that was originally recorded by Joe Boyd in 1984.  At least one of the songs, "To Cry About", had been written as early as 1980. According to the liner notes of a later reissue, six of the tracks were recorded in 1984, four in 1988, and one in 1983 and mixed later.

1990s–2000s 
On their 1990 album The Caution Horses, the Cowboy Junkies recorded a sparse, haunting version of O'Hara's song "You Will Be Loved Again". In 1991, O'Hara followed up with a four-song EP of Christmas material. Following the Christmas EP, O'Hara took on several acting roles and appeared as a vocalist on recordings by a variety of other artists, including Morrissey ("November Spawned a Monster"), John & Mary, Bruce Cockburn, Holly Cole, Bob Wiseman, Meryn Cadell, The Henrys and Neko Case. She performed Dark, Dear Heart at John Candy's funeral in March 1994. She also contributed songs to a number of compilation albums, including tributes to Vic Chesnutt and Kurt Weill, and participated in a 1994 Christmas concert with Holly Cole, Rebecca Jenkins, Jane Siberry and Victoria Williams, which was released as the album Count Your Blessings. As well, she has occasionally performed in musical theatre, most notably productions of Tom Waits' experimental rock opera The Black Rider, stealing the show according to Pitchfork.com.

During an R.E.M. concert in Toronto in 1999, Michael Stipe brought O'Hara on stage and declared her a "national treasure". Other artists who are said to be fans include Kristin Hersh, Radiohead, Dave Matthews and Rickie Lee Jones. However, she did not release a new recording under her own name until 2001, when she and longtime guitarist Rusty McCarthy contributed to the soundtrack for the Canadian film Apartment Hunting (in which she also acted).

On October 4 and 5, 2006, O'Hara performed Leonard Cohen's "Hallelujah" (with Gavin Friday) and "The Window" at Came So Far For Beauty, the Leonard Cohen Tribute organised by Hal Willner at The Point Theatre in Dublin, Ireland. She performed at the All Tomorrow's Parties festival in Minehead, England, over the weekend of April 27 to 29, 2007, and with Howe Gelb and friends at the Barbican Centre in London on May 2, 2007.

O'Hara also performed at Toronto's Canwest Cabaret Festival in both 2008 and 2009. In 2008, she performed at tribute shows to Cohen, Weill and Duke Ellington, and in 2009, she participated in a musical improvisation show with Michael Snow and Aidan Closs. She also gave a rare radio interview to promote the 2009 show, appearing on CBC Radio One's Q on October 28 — and performing an impromptu duet of "Baby, It's Cold Outside" with host Jian Ghomeshi.

O'Hara sings the theme song for Someone Knows Something, a true-crime podcast from the CBC. The song was written by Bob Wiseman.

On Sunday, November 12, 2017, O'Hara performed a rare live show at Le Guess Who? Festival in Utrecht, The Netherlands. O'Hara was invited by artist Perfume Genius who curated a program for the festival.

Work with other artists and acting
She appeared in the 1985 film The Last Polka as Gerta Lemon, one half of the Lemon Sisters singing duo alongside Catherine as Sylvie Lemon.

In December 1989 she was featured in The Razorbacks' CBC Television Christmas special It's a Razorbacks Christmas Barbeque, for which she received a Gemini Award nomination for Best Performance in a Variety or Performing Arts Program or Series at the 5th Gemini Awards in 1990.

O'Hara sang backup vocals for Morrissey on his song "November Spawned a Monster". She contributed to four albums by Bob Wiseman: In Her Dream, Accidentally Acquired Beliefs, Theme and Variations, and Giulietta Masina At The Oscars Crying. She also contributed to Justin Rutledge's album No Never Alone. She recorded a duet with Tindersticks called "Peanuts", which appeared on their 2010 album Falling Down A Mountain. On May 15, 2009 in Toronto, Will Oldham brought her on stage to perform a cover of John Prine's "In Spite of Ourselves".

O'Hara has made several film appearances. She acts alongside Tom Waits in Candy Mountain (1986), directed by Robert Frank and Rudy Wurlitzer. O'Hara has a leading role in Museum Hours (2012), set in and around the Kunsthistorisches Museum, Vienna, directed by Jem Cohen.

Tributes
Musician Steve Adey recorded a song titled "Mary Margaret O'Hara" on his 2006 LP All Things Real.

Adey also covered "To Cry About" on his 2017 LP Do Me a Kindness.

“Something To Cry About” in the short story collection Radium Girl by Sofi Papamarko was inspired by the song “To Cry About” and built around three prompts given to the author by the singer on request.

Discography

Albums
 Miss America (1988)
 Apartment Hunting (2001)

EPs
 Christmas EP (1991)

Singles
 This Is What I Want (2014)

Contributions
 Kip Hanrahan, Paul Haines – Darn It! (1993) - two songs with Gary Lucas to lyrics by Paul Haines
 John & Mary, The Weedkiller's Daughter (1993) - background vocals
 Count Your Blessings (1994) - collaborative concert with Jane Siberry, Holly Cole, Rebecca Jenkins and Victoria Williams
 Songs for My Mother and Father (1996) - guest vocal on Hugh Marsh album
The Henrys, Puerto Angel (1996) - vocals on three songs, including "Dark Dear Heart"
 Sweet Relief II: Gravity of the Situation (1996) - "Florida"
 September Songs – The Music of Kurt Weill (1997) - "Fürchte dich nicht"
 O'Hara participated in some concerts of Hal Wilner's Harry Smith Project Revisited tour during 1999-2001. On the concert album, released in 2006, she performs the folk song "He Got Better Things for You" and on the accompanying DVD she can also be seen singing backing vocals to Gavin Friday's version of "When That Great Ship Went Down".
 Stormy Weather: The Music of Harold Arlen (2003) - "Blues in the Night"
 Dark Was the Night: A Tribute to the Music of Blind Willie Johnson (2004)"God Moves on the Water" 
 Rogue's Gallery: Pirate Ballads, Sea Songs, and Chanteys (2006) - "The Cry of Man"
 Tindersticks, Falling Down a Mountain (2010) - Guest vocal on "Peanuts"
 Garth Hudson Presents: A Canadian Celebration of The Band (2010) - "Out of the Blue"
 Blackie and the Rodeo Kings, Kings and Queens (2011) - "Heart a Mine"
 Son of Rogues Gallery: Pirate Ballads, Sea Songs & Chanteys (2013) - "Then Said the Captain to Me (Two Poems of the Sea)"
 The Hidden Cameras, Age (2014) - Guest vocals on "Gay Goth Scene"

Filmography

References

External links 
 

Actresses from Toronto
Canadian women pop singers
Canadian women singer-songwriters
Canadian singer-songwriters
Canadian film actresses
Living people
Musicians from Toronto
20th-century Canadian women singers
21st-century Canadian women singers
1950s births
Canadian people of Irish descent